Craig Marais (born 28 May 2002) is a field hockey player from Australia, who plays as a forward.

Personal life
Craig Marais was born and raised in Brighton East, Victoria.

He is currently studying business at Monash University.

Career

Domestic hockey
In 2019, Marais was a member of the HC Melbourne team for the inaugural season of the Sultana Bran Hockey One League.

National teams

Under–18
Craig Marais made his debut for Australia in 2018, where he was a member of the Under–18 team at the Youth Olympics in Buenos Aires.

Kookaburras
In 2022, Marais was named in the Kookaburras for the first time. In April of that year, he made his senior international debut in a test series against Malaysia in Perth.

References

External links
 
 

2002 births
Living people
People educated at Brighton Grammar School
Australian male field hockey players
Male field hockey forwards
Field hockey players from Melbourne
People from Brighton, Victoria
Monash University alumni